Fort Kinnaird is a large outdoor retail park located off the A1 in the south-east of Edinburgh, Scotland. Often known simply as ‘the Fort’ to locals, it is currently the second largest retail park in the UK with 75 units occupied.

History
Built on the site of the former Newcraighall Colliery, the retail park opened in 1989 as Craig Park. Edinburgh's very first multiplex cinema was opened at the park in 1990 by UCI Cinemas. Its name was later changed to Kinnaird Park. 

Over the years, it has expanded into land surrounding the original footprint of the original Kinnaird Park, including the site of the former Niddrie Brickworks, which closed down in 1991. The site was branded separately as Edinburgh Fort. Eventually both sites were renamed under its current name in the late 1990s.

In 2008, the cinema, which was now operated by Odeon Cinemas, along with its adjacent bowling alley, was closed down and demolished.

In late 2013 work started on a £24m extension to the park. It included 7 restaurants, a children's play area and a seven-screen cinema, which was built on the same site as the original cinema that had been demolished 5 years earlier. The cinema is once again operated by Odeon. The development was completed in March 2015.

In 2018, M&G Real Estate purchased the Crown Estate's 50% stake in the retail park for £167.25 million, forming a joint venture with The Hercules Unit Trust, the existing owners of the other 50%.

Stores

The retail park has many high street brands such as Marks and Spencer, River Island, Primark, Next, Fatface, H&M, New Look and until 2021, OUTFIT (comprising Topshop, Topman, Burton, Dorothy Perkins, Miss Selfridge, Wallis and Quiz Clothing).

Stores range from large to smaller units. Other stores include Boots, WH Smith, Waterstones, Smyths, Oak Furniture Land, HomeSense, T.K. Maxx, Argos, Specsavers and Tapi Carpets.

The retail park also has many food outlets, including Bread Meats Bread, McDonald's, Pizza Hut, Pizza Express, Tony Macaroni, Subway, Costa Coffee, Starbucks, Frankie & Benny's, KFC, Burger King and Nando's.

References

Shopping centres in Edinburgh
Shopping centres in Scotland
Retail parks in the United Kingdom
1989 establishments in Scotland